Joseph McGinty or Joe McGinty may refer to:

Joe McGinty (born 1963), American composer, keyboardist and arranger 
Joseph McGinty, fiddle player in Zydepunks

See also